Pune Airport is an airport north-east of Pune in Maharashtra, India.

Pune Airport may also refer to:
 New Pune Airport, a proposed airport.

See also
 NDA Gliderdrome
 Lohegaon Air Force Station
 Hadapsar Airport